Falsotrachystola is a genus of longhorn beetles of the subfamily Lamiinae, containing the following species:

 Falsotrachystola asidiformis (Pic, 1915)
 Falsotrachystola torquata Holzschuh, 2007

References

Morimopsini